Francesco Vaccaro may refer to:

 Francesco Vaccaro (painter) (c. 1636–1675), Bolognese painter and engraver of the Baroque period
 Francesco Vaccaro (footballer) (born 1999), Italian footballer